Borosia is a monotypic snout moth genus described by László Anthony Gozmány in 1959. Its only species, Borosia aegyptiaca, described by the same author in the same year, is found in Egypt.

References

Phycitinae
Monotypic moth genera
Endemic fauna of Egypt
Moths of Africa